Ming Hong Tang, also known as Cheuk Yan Tang (born 23 July 1993 in Hong Kong) is a Hong Kong professional squash player.

Early life 
On 23 July 1993, Tang was born in Hong Kong.

Career 
As of February 2018, Tang was ranked number 125 in the world in professional squash. In 2016 he won his first PSA title, the Singapore Open, defeating runner-up Malaysian Elvinn Keo.

Selected tournament results
 Bronze medal at the Incheon 2014 Asian games representing Team Hong Kong.
 Champion at the 2018 Singapore Open.
 Runner-up at the 2017 PSA Perrier Challenge Cup.
 Champion at the 2018 Malaysian Squash Tour IV.

References

1993 births
Living people
Hong Kong male squash players
Asian Games medalists in squash
Asian Games bronze medalists for Hong Kong
Squash players at the 2014 Asian Games
Medalists at the 2014 Asian Games
21st-century Hong Kong people